William Bedster (1734 – 1805) was an English cricketer who played during the late 18th century.

Bedster was born in 1734 at Walberton near Chichester in Sussex. He made his first appearance in first-class cricket in 1777, playing in an England side against a Hampshire XI. In a career which lasted until 1794 he played in 59 matches which have been given first-class status, scoring 1,335 runs and taking at least 26 wickets. He played for a wide variety of sides, appearing most frequently for England and Middlesex sides in first-class matches.

Bedster was employed as a butler for five years by Charles Bennet, 4th Earl of Tankerville at his Mount Felix estate at Walton-on-Thames. During this time he played for Chertsey Cricket Club. He was frequently used as a given man by other sides. After his playing career was over, Bedster moved to Chelsea where he was an innkeeper. He died in 1805. A road in Molesey in Surrey is named after him.

Notes

References

English cricketers
Surrey cricketers
English cricketers of 1701 to 1786
1750 births
1805 deaths
Hampshire cricketers
Kent cricketers
Middlesex cricketers
Marylebone Cricket Club cricketers
Berkshire cricketers
White Conduit Club cricketers
English cricketers of 1787 to 1825
West Kent cricketers
Non-international England cricketers
Brighton cricketers
Old Etonians cricketers
Chertsey cricketers
Middlesex and Marylebone Cricket Club cricketers